The  is a traditional Japanese garden located in the city of Tsuruoka, Yamagata Prefecture, Japan, which is a nationally designated Place of Scenic Beauty

Overview
This garden was garden of the Sakai clan, daimyō of Shōnai Domain and was constructed in the third bailey of Tsuruoka Castle at some time after Sakai Tadakatsu became daimyō in 1622. It is a rare example of a Shoin-style garden in northern Japan, and includes a pond, dry waterfall, numerous stones to form an artificial canyon, and included a view of distant Mount Chōkai as part of a borrowed scenery. It was restored in 1971 and designated as a National Place of Scenic Beauty in 1976. The garden is part of the Chidō Museum, which includes the former Chidōkan han school and a giyōfū style building which was formerly the Yamagata Prefectural Police headquarters.

See also
 List of Places of Scenic Beauty of Japan (Yamagata)

References

External links

 Cultural Assets of Yamagata Prefecture 

Gardens in Akita Prefecture
Places of Scenic Beauty
Tsuruoka, Yamagata